Shimon "Shim" Moore is a rock music songwriter, producer, performing artist, as well as a TV and film actor. Shimon was born on November 11, 1982, in Sydney, Australia.

Acting career
He began his acting career at the age of nine when he was cast for an ice cream commercial which led to other commercial roles including Kellogg's and McDonalds. At the age of ten he became interested in music and began learning to play instruments and writing songs. At the age of 17 Shimon became a professional movie actor when he was cast for the leading role of Jamie Duncan, a young teenager enchanted with mythical powers, in the 2000 fantasy fiction film Selkie. Three years later he appeared in an episode of the TV show All Saints as hospital patient Tim Mannix, but during all of this time he was also developing his own music.

Music career
In 1997, Moore co-founded the band Sick Puppies and became the front man, lead singer, songwriter, and guitarist for 17 years. The Sick Puppies began their journey to fame after winning the Sydney (Triple J) Unearthed competition, against 3,000 other entries in 2000 with their single "Nothing Really Matters". When the band moved to Los Angeles, California in 2005, they struggled to find a record label who would sign them until 2006 when Shimon uploaded a video to YouTube about the Free Hugs Campaign and used one of the songs he had written with the band, "All The Same", as the soundtrack. To promote the video and band Shimon appeared TV shows including 60 minutes, Jay Leno, and The Oprah Winfrey show. Virgin Records signed the band to their label a month later. They released 3 full-length albums Dressed Up As Life, Tri-Polar, and Connect. Tri-Polar was later also re-recorded into an acoustic mini album called Polar Opposite.  Shimon played 725 concerts in 13 countries with The Sick Puppies in the US, UK, France, Netherlands, Switzerland, Germany, Denmark, Sweden, Finland, Russia, Canada, New Zealand, and Australia sometimes with other acts including Evanescence, Breaking Benjamin, Shinedown, Papa Roach, Sevendust, Deep Purple, Nickelback, Korn, Soundgarden, Stone Temple Pilots, Three Days Grace and Mötley Crüe. 

In 2009, Moore wrote and co-produced the song "War" for the video game Street Fighter which became the soundtrack for the national advertising campaign. Also in 2009 he appeared in the documentary "Rock Prophecies" which won the Audience Award for Best Documentary at the 2009 AFI Dallas Film Festival. A year later one of the songs Shimon co-wrote with the band, "You're Going Down", was featured in the soundtrack for the 2009 action adventure film, Tekken (2009 film). In 2011, Shimon returned to the silver screen when he appeared in the horror film "The Day" playing the part of "Boss", a predatory post-apocalyptic cannibal. In 2012, Shim received a BMI (Broadcast Music Inc.) Songwriter Award  for Maybe, which sold over 2 million singles and 1 million Sick Puppies albums. Moore continued to write and perform with the Sick Puppies, even directing some of their music videos, until 2014 when the band split.

In late 2014, Moore co-wrote the song "Wasted Love" which was debuted on The Voice Season 7 and hit #1 on the US iTunes singles chart.

On 16 May 2018, Shim released his debut single "Hallelujah" from his solo album SHIM. on May 20 he played his first solo show to a sold-out crowd of 140,000 people at the Rock on the Range music festival in Ohio. The Album “SHIM” was released later that year on Sep 14, 2018. One of the tracks off that album, "All of Me", was selected as the official theme song for  WWE's "Tribute to the Troops” and was featured in the opening titles of its broadcast in December. In 2019, Shimon released another single, "Crucified" and booked a live tour of the US with his new supporting band members as "Shim-The Crucified Tour" in 22 cities across the country. Later that year he co-wrote and performed the lyrics for the official theme song of the video game Resident Evil 2, "Saudade" which won Best Original Song-Video Game in the Hollywood Music in Media Awards.

Live streaming

During the 2020 lockdown, Shim created The Hollywood Rebellion live stream channel on Twitch. During the pandemic, he live streamed acoustic performances, Q and A sessions, and collaborative songwriting streams called “The Lockdown Sessions”. The Hollywood Rebellion streams continued after the lockdown was lifted and are ongoing. In February of 2022, Shimon changed the name of his Twitch channel to ShimMusic.

Upcoming projects
Shimon is currently working on new music for a hard rock album set for 2022.

Discography

Studio albums

with Sick Puppies

Welcome to the Real World (2001)
Dressed Up as Life (2007)
Tri-Polar (2009)
Connect (2013)

Singles

Music videos

References 

Living people
20th-century Australian male singers
21st-century Australian male singers
Alternative rock guitarists
Alternative rock singers
Australian alternative rock musicians
Australian heavy metal guitarists
Australian heavy metal singers
Australian rock singers
1982 births